Kashan is a village in Goyjah Bel Rural District, in the Central District of Ahar County, East Azerbaijan Province, Iran. At the 2006 census, its population was 99, in 17 families.

References 

Populated places in Ahar County